The Captain's Captain is a lost 1919 silent film comedy drama directed by Tom Terriss and starring Alice Joyce. It is based on a novel by James A. Cooper. It was produced and released by Vitagraph Company of America.

Cast
Alice Joyce – Louise Greyling
Arthur Donaldson – Cap'n Abe/Am'zon
Percy Standing – Cap'n Joab
Julia Swayne Gordon – Aun Euphemia
Eulalie Jensen – Betty Gallup
Maurice Costello – Lawford Tapp

References

External links

1919 films
American silent feature films
Films directed by Tom Terriss
Vitagraph Studios films
Lost American films
American black-and-white films
1910s English-language films
1919 comedy-drama films
1919 lost films
Lost comedy-drama films
1910s American films
Silent American comedy-drama films